Signed by Katie Price (formerly Discovered by Katie Price) is a British reality television show aired on Sky Living, in which 13 contestants compete for a contract with management company Blacksheep Management (owned by glamour model Katie Price,) a mentorship with Price, yearly calendars, red carpet events, overseas job, magazine deals, a Range Rover for a year, and a spread in a fashion magazine which includes appearing on the front cover and a holiday in Maldives. Other benefits includes a car, vacation, or an apartment amongst other things.

Signed by Katie Price was one of the first shows to be produced by Price's own production company Pricey Media.

Auditions
Auditions were held in four of the United Kingdom's biggest cities including:
 Leeds;
 Bristol;
 London;
 Birmingham
Over 10,000 people auditioned for Signed By Katie Price across all four locations. Contestants auditioned in front of three judges— Glen Middleham, Bayo Furlong and Katie Price.

Contestants

Episodes

Episode 1
Contestants audition for the three judges at their local shopping centers in front of the general public. Each contestant auditions individually by walking down a catwalk before having their photo taken by a photographer. After having their photograph taken, the image is shown on a screen for the judges to look at while they interview the contestant. If the judges want to see more of the contestant, they are instructed to change into their swimwear or lingerie before walking the catwalk again. Each contestant then receives critiques and feedback, but only 50 contestants are chosen from the live auditions to attend Bootcamp.

Episode 2
The 50 selected contestants from Episode 1 (Auditions) head to Bootcamp. The finalists have only 48 hours to display their marketability using their personality, creativity and flair. The first task set by Katie Price during the Bootcamp workshop, which is for the female contestants to remove all makeup and strip down to their underwear, while the male contestants strip down to black and pink underwear. All contestants are then reviewed by the panel of judges, where they will choose their top 12 contestants. The Final contestants chosen are Rehea Watson, Nathan DiCarlo, Tayla-Jay Harris, Melissa Reeves, Susie Whiteley, Billy Harding, Jemma Henley, Jamie Roche, Sarah Meade, Kirsten Van Terheyden, Rylan Clark-Neal and Amy Willerton.

Episode 3
The final twelve chosen contestants move into a luxury house for their first assignment, which is to participate in an equestrian-themed photo shoot on Katie Price's ranch. The second assignment for the episode is for each contestant to participate in an interview with UK newspaper The Sun. The goal of the challenge is to learn the art of "No Comment" when dealing with the press. 

Nathan DiCarlo and Rehea Watson are eliminated from the competition, leaving 10 contestants remaining.

During the eliminations, a wildcard entry (Ben Sissman) joins the competition to create the top 13 contestants.

Episode 4
The final eleven contestants' next assignment are to create the ultimate campaign poster, built around a product with a brief provided by the judges. Tayla-Jay Harris is eliminated after failing to impress the judges, and during eliminations, the wildcard entry (Ben Sissman) leaves the competition.

Episode 5
The nine contestants remaining are given the next assignment by Katie Price, which is to generate self-publicity by creating an online viral video campaign about themselves. Rewarding the contestants for their efforts in the assignment, Katie invites them to a star-studded glittering party, where she watches their every move as a hidden challenge. Melissa Reeves and Susie Whitely are eliminated from the competition for failing to impress the judges.

Episode 6
The final seven contestants are given the assignment to have a complete makeover. After the makeover, each contestant must have a photo shoot and sell their new image with confidence. Billy Harding and Jemma Henley are eliminated, leaving the remaining contestants to form the final five.

Episode 7
The final five contestants are given their next assignment, which is being secretly judged by a handpicked focus group. Each contestant listens in as they are judged. Each contestant is given a score out of ten by the focus group, after looking at their recent photoshoots and watching their video. The final score will count towards their chances of elimination. The next assignment they are given is to sell themselves to the directors of Blacksheep Management (Danny Infield and Andrew Antonio). Danny Infield is Katie Price's brother who has handled her finances for the last 15 years, and Andrew Antonio has handled her business affairs for the last 9 years. During these challenges, Katie is judging contestants on their ability to promote themselves. Jamie Roche and Sarah Meade are eliminated, leaving Kirsten Van Terheyden, Rylan Clarke and Amy Willerton as the final three.

Episode 8
During Episode 8, the final three contestants have to shoot a campaign. The winner will receive their own perfume, and the campaign photos will be used to promote their upcoming perfume. Once the winner is announced, they will participate in a press launch for the perfume. The second assignment is to participate in a photo shoot that is directed by Katie, and the winner will use the photos for the press after being crowned the winner of Signed by Katie Price. Katie eliminates Kirsten Van Terheyden in a final interview with Katie at her house, leaving Rylan Clark and Amy Willerton as the final two. During a press call, each contestant explains their perfumes and photo shoot for the campaign, and also participates in a Q&A session with the public and press.

During Episode 8 the judges deliberate, and Katie announces the winner as Amy Willerton leaving Rylan Clark-Neal as the runner-up.

Controversy
Following Amy's win, Katie Price and her management failed to materialize a number of promised prizes. She was asked to pay £10,000 to insure her "free" Range Rover for a year, a holiday in The Maldives turned into Marbella and a cover shoot with OK! magazine disappeared. Ms. Willerton eventually refused to sign the modelling contract offered to her by Blacksheep Management, as she'd lost confidence in their ability to deliver on promises made.

Finalists

Reaction
Readers of UKGameshows.com named it on a two-way tie, the seventh-worst new game show of 2011 in their "Hall of shame" poll.

References

2011 British television series debuts
2011 British television series endings
British reality television series
Sky Living original programming
Katie Price
Modeling-themed reality television series
British fashion